Wahyu Prasetyo (born 21 March 1998) is an Indonesian professional footballer who plays as a centre-back for Liga 1 club PSIS Semarang.

Club career

Persik Kendal
He was signed for Persik Kendal to play in Liga 2 in the 2018 season.

Cilegon United
In 2019, Wahyu Prasetyo signed a one-year contract with Indonesian Liga 2 club Cilegon United.

PSIS Semarang
In 2020, Wahyu signed for Indonesian Liga 1 club PSIS Semarang. This season was suspended on 27 March 2020 due to the COVID-19 pandemic. The season was abandoned and was declared void on 20 January 2021.

Career statistics

Club

References

External links
 Wahyu Prasetyo at Soccerway

1998 births
Living people
Indonesian footballers
Liga 2 (Indonesia) players
Liga 1 (Indonesia) players
Cilegon United players
PSIS Semarang players
Association football central defenders
Sportspeople from Central Java
21st-century Indonesian people